Leuconitocris argyrostigma is a species of beetle in the family Cerambycidae. It was described by Per Olof Christopher Aurivillius in 1914.

Subspecies
 Leuconitocris argyrostigma argyrostigma Aurivillius, 1914
 Leuconitocris argyrostigma transvaalica (Breuning, 1961)
 Leuconitocris argyrostigma mozambica (Breuning, 1971)

References

Leuconitocris
Beetles described in 1914